Kiah Melverton (born 5 November 1996) is an Australian swimmer.

2015 season
She won double bronze at the 2015 Summer Universiade in the 800 metres and 1500 metres.

2016 season
At the 2016 Australian Swimming Championships, Melverton won bronze in the 400 metre freestyle.

In November 2016, Melverton competed in the 2016 Australian Short Course Swimming Championships which acted as selection trials for the 2016 FINA World Swimming Championships (25 m) held in Windsor, Ontario, Canada. At these championships, she earned silver in the 400 metre freestyle and gold in the 800 metre freestyle, earning a national championship and her Australian senior team debut.

Competing at the 2016 FINA World Swimming Championships (25 m), Melverton won bronze in the 800 metre freestyle. In earning the bronze, she swam a personal best time of 8:16.51.

Open water swimming
Melverton is also an accomplished open water swimmer.

In October 2016, she competed in the Burleigh Ocean Swim, taking out the women's 1k and 2k events.

At the 2017 Australian Open Water Swimming Championships held in Adelaide, South Australia, Melverton took gold in the women's 5k event, earning nomination for selection for the
17th FINA World Aquatics Championships to be held in Budapest, Hungary in July 2017.

World records

Long course metres

 split 1:55.40 (2nd leg); with Madison Wilson (1st leg), Mollie O'Callaghan (3rd leg), Ariarne Titmus (4th leg)

References

External links 
 
 

1996 births
Living people
Australian female freestyle swimmers
Swimmers at the 2018 Commonwealth Games
Swimmers at the 2022 Commonwealth Games
Commonwealth Games medallists in swimming
Commonwealth Games gold medallists for Australia
Commonwealth Games silver medallists for Australia
Commonwealth Games bronze medallists for Australia
World Aquatics Championships medalists in swimming
Medalists at the FINA World Swimming Championships (25 m)
Olympic swimmers of Australia
Swimmers at the 2020 Summer Olympics
Universiade bronze medalists for Australia
Universiade medalists in swimming
Medalists at the 2015 Summer Universiade
21st-century Australian women
Sportspeople from the Gold Coast, Queensland
Sportswomen from Queensland
Medallists at the 2018 Commonwealth Games
Medallists at the 2022 Commonwealth Games